Bulbophyllum inconspicuum (inconspicuous bulbophyllum) is a species of orchid.

inconspicuum